Lindsay Green may refer to:

 Lindsay Green (cricketer) (born 1938), New Zealand cricketer
 Lindsay Green (footballer) (1930-1998), Australian rules footballer